was a Japanese speed skater who competed in the 1932 Winter Olympics. He was eliminated in the heats of the 500 m, 1500 m, 5000 m, and 10000 m events.

References

External links

1902 births
1999 deaths
Japanese male speed skaters
Speed skaters at the 1932 Winter Olympics
Olympic speed skaters of Japan
20th-century Japanese people